Otradnoye is a rural locality (a selo) in Yavengskoye Rural Settlement, Vozhegodsky District, Vologda Oblast, Russia. The population was 12 as of 2002.

Geography 
Otradnoye is located 19 km northeast of Vozhega (the district's administrative centre) by road. Funikovo is the nearest rural locality.

References 

Rural localities in Vozhegodsky District